Sarah Grilo (circa 1919 – 2007) was an Argentine painter who is best known for her abstract gestural paintings. Married to the artist José Antonio Fernández-Muro, she lived in Buenos Aires, Paris, New York and Madrid.

She is considered one of the most important Latin American artists of the 20th century.

Career 
Sarah Grilo began her career as a self-taught artist. In 1944, she began studying at the studio of the Catalan artist Vicente Puig. There, she met her husband, the artist José Antonio Fernández-Muro.

In 1949, she presented her first solo exhibition in Madrid, which was characterised by being a mixture of figuration and cubism.

Around this period, her paintings became more abstract. In 1952, she joined the group Artistas Modernos de la Argentina, under the direction of Aldo Pellegrini.

The group, made up of artists such as Enio Iommi, Alfredo Hlito, Tomàs Maldonado, Lidy Prati and José Antonio Fernández-Muro, among others, was presented in exhibitions at the Stedelijk Museum in Amsterdam and at the Museum of Modern Art, Rio de Janeiro until it was dissolved in 1954.

Following the dissolution of the group, Sarah Grilo moved to Paris. During this period, between 1957 and 1961, her work became more lyrical.

In 1962, she won the Guggenheim Fellowship. The prize marked a turning point in her career and she moved to New York. From then on, she gradually freed herself from Geometric abstraction and developed a new plastic language. Her gestural works combined coloured surfaces, drips, digital and textual signs, graffiti.

In 1970, the artist left for the south of Spain, where she would stay until 1979 with her family. From 1980 she alternated her stay between Paris and Madrid, where she definitely moved to live with her husband in 1985, until her death in 2007.

Sarah Grilo has exhibited in numerous galleries and institutions in the United States, Latin America, and Europe. These include: the National Museum of Fine Arts in Buenos Aires; The Museo de Bellas Artes, Caracas; The Instituto de Arte Contemporáneo, Lima; The Solomon R. Guggenheim Museum, New York; The Cisneros Fontanals Art Foundation (CIFO), Miami; The Art Museum of the Americas, Washington D.C.; The Nelson RockefellerCollection, New York; The Blanton Museum of Art, Austin; The Stedelijk Museum Amsterdam; The Museo Español de Arte Contemporáneo, Madrid; and The Museo Nacional Centro de Arte Reina Sofía, Madrid, among others.

Main exhibitions 
 2021
Galerie Lelong & Co., Paris - France
2018:
Galerie Lelong & Co., Paris - France
Museo de Arte Contemporaneo de Alicante (MACA) - Spain
 2017:
Museum of Modern Art (MoMA), New York City - USA
 Museo de Arte Contemporaneo Latinoamericano (MACLA), La Plata - Argentina
 2016: Jorge Mara la Ruche Gallery, Buenos Aires - Argentina
 2015:
 Jorge Mara la Ruche Gallery, Buenos Aires - Argentina
 Museo de Arte Contemporaneo Latinoamericano (MACLA), La Plata - Argentina
 2014:
 Galeria Jacques Martínez, Buenos Aires - Argentina
 Jorge Mara la Ruche Gallery, Buenos Aires - Argentina
 Museo de Arte Contemporaneo Latinoamericano (MACLA), La Plata - Argentina
 2012: Art Museum of the Americas (AMA), Washington - USA
 2010: Fundación PROA, Buenos Aires - Argentina
 2007:
 Fundación Luis Seoane, La Corogne - Spain
 Jorge Mara la Ruche Gallery, Buenos Aires - Argentina
 2006:
 Art Museum of the Americas (AMA), Washington - USA
 Museo de Arte Contemporaneo Latinoamericano (MACLA), La Plata - Argentina
 2005: Museo Genaro Pérez, Cordoba - Spain
 2001: Blanton Museum of Art, Austin - USA
 1995: Phoenix At Museum - USA
 1994: Milwaukee Art Museum - USA
 1978: San Francisco Museum of Modern Art - USA
 1963: Paul Bianchini Gallery, New York - USA
 1958: Galería Bonino, Buenos Aires - Argentina

Biennals 

 1956 : Venice Biennale
1953 : II Biennale of São Paulo Modern Art Museum- São Paulo - Brazil
 1951 : I Biennale of São Paulo Modern Art Museum - São Paulo - Brazil

Collections 
 Museo de Arte Contemporaneo Latinoamericano (MACLA), La Plata - Argentina
 Museo Nacional Centro de Arte Reina Sofía.

References

External links 
 Sarah Grilo at Galerie Lelong
 Official website
 Sarah Grilo.com

1910s births
2007 deaths
20th-century Argentine painters
20th-century Argentine women artists
20th-century Argentine artists
Argentine women painters
Argentine painters
Artists from Buenos Aires